Dorogawa Dam is a dam in Karuizawa, Nagano Prefecture, Japan. The kanji in the name translate to "Muddy River" Dam.

See also
 List of dams and reservoirs in Japan

Dams in Nagano Prefecture
Gravity dams